Ibrahim ibn Asim al-Uqayli (died 743/4) was a military commander of the Umayyad Caliphate and governor of Sistan.

Ibrahim ibn Asim al-Uqayli hailed from the Jazira, and belonged to the Banu Uqayl tribe of the Qays. He served as a commander in Khurasan against the Turgesh under both Asim ibn Abdallah al-Hilali and later under Asad ibn Abdallah al-Qasri. Under Asad he commanded the eponymous baggage train in the Battle of the Baggage in September 737, a heavy defeat for the Muslims.

He was appointed governor of Sistan by the governor of Iraq, Yusuf ibn Umar al-Thaqafi. On his arrival in his province in July 738, on Yusuf's urging, he either killed his predecessor, Ibn Abi Burda, and seized his property, or imprisoned him and sent him to Iraq where Yusuf killed him under torture. Ibrahim died in office in 743/4.

References

Sources 
 
 
 

740s deaths
Generals of the Umayyad Caliphate
Umayyad governors of Sijistan
Year of birth unknown
8th-century Arabs
Banu Uqayl